Richard Liburd (born 26 September 1973) is an English footballer who is a defender who last played for Hucknall Town. He previously played league football with Middlesbrough, Bradford City, Carlisle United, Notts County and Lincoln City.

Playing career
Born in Nottingham, Liburd started out his football career as a youth trainee with Nottingham Forest. Released at the end of his two-year training period, he joined Eastwood Town. Rapidly making an impression at Eastwood, he joined Middlesbrough, on trial, in early 1993, completing a £72,500 transfer in March 1993. He played 41 games for 'Boro' until his next move was to join Bradford City for £200,000 in July 1994. He was a key member of the Bantams for more than three years, helping them to promotion from Division Two in 1995–96 before he left to join Carlisle United after 79 games at Valley Parade. His career took him to Notts County and Lincoln City before he returned to Eastwood.

His return lasted less than a season and Liburd was out of regular football until he joined Nottinghamshire Senior League club Boots Athletic in September 2006. He moved on to Basford United before departing in January 2007. In July 2007, he had an unsuccessful trial with Hucknall Town, appearing in a pre-season friendly against Carlton Town. However, in November 2008 he was signed for Hucknall by the new director of football Brian Chambers.

References

External links

Lincoln City F.C. Official Archive Profile
Unofficial Richard Liburd Profile at The Forgotten Imp

1973 births
Living people
Footballers from Nottingham
English footballers
Association football defenders
Nottingham Forest F.C. players
Eastwood Town F.C. players
Middlesbrough F.C. players
Bradford City A.F.C. players
Carlisle United F.C. players
Notts County F.C. players
Lincoln City F.C. players
Boots Athletic F.C. players
Basford United F.C. players
Hucknall Town F.C. players
English Football League players